The Taça Ribeiro dos Reis (Ribeiro dos Reis Cup) was a competition organized by the Portuguese Football Federation started in the 1961–62 football season and which had its last edition on the 1970–71 season. It is named after António Ribeiro dos Reis, a former Portuguese football player, coach, journalist, and FPF director, and the first Portuguese nominated for the FIFA Refereeing Committee.

Format
Teams were divided in 4 groups according to geographical proximity. Teams played against each other once in group matches. The winners of the groups advanced to one legged semi-final (one for southern teams and another for northern teams). Semi-final winners advanced to the final, semi-final losers played for the third place playoff. In the last two editions there were 7 groups and a quarter-final phase, with one team receiving a bye through the next round.

Ribeiro dos Reis Cup finals

Performance by club

Participating clubs

Defunct football cup competitions in Portugal